Michele Savrie (born 3 August 1984) is an Italian lightweight rower. He won a gold medal at the 2005 World Rowing Championships in Kaizu with the lightweight men's eight.

References

1984 births
Living people
Italian male rowers
World Rowing Championships medalists for Italy